The 1973 Soviet Cup was an association football cup competition of the Soviet Union. The winner of the competition, Ararat Yerevan qualified for the continental tournament.

Competition schedule

Preliminary round
 [Mar 4, 10] 
 Kuzbass Kemerovo           0-0  1-2  METALLIST Kharkov 
 Metallurg Lipetsk          1-1  0-2  SPARTAK Nalchik 
 METALLURG Zaporozhye       3-0  1-0  Stroitel Ashkhabad 
 TEXTILSHCHIK Ivanovo       3-2  1-0  Spartak Ivano-Frankovsk

First round
 [Mar 14, Apr 1] 
 SPARTAK Moskva             0-0  2-1  Nistru Kishinev 
   [1. Att: 2,000 (in Sochi)] 
   [2. Alexandr Piskaryov 17, 39 - Valeriy Zhuravlyov 80. Att: 18,000] 
 [Mar 15, Apr 1] 
 DINAMO Minsk               1-0  0-0  Zvezda Perm 
   [1. Anatoliy Vasilyev 43. Att: 3,000 (in Pyatigorsk)] 
   [2. Att: 2,000 (in Sochi)] 
 DINAMO Tbilisi             2-0  0-0  Krylya Sovetov Kuibyshev 
   [1. Givi Nodia 30, Kakhi Asatiani 85 pen. Att: 25,000] 
   [2. Att: 16,000 (in Stavropol)] 
 DNEPR Dnepropetrovsk       1-1  1-0  Lokomotiv Moskva 
   [1. Yuriy Solovyov 65 – Anatoliy Piskunov 40. Att: 20,000] 
   [2. Alexei Khristyan 76. Att: 2,000 (in Hosta)] 
 Metallist Kharkov          0-3  0-3  DINAMO Kiev 
   [1. Viktor Kolotov 60, Oleg Blokhin 67, Anatoliy Puzach 71. Att: 10,000 (in Sevastopol)] 
   [2. Anatoliy Puzach 4, Vladimir Muntyan 77, Oleg Blokhin 84. Att: 20,000] 
 Shinnik Yaroslavl          0-0  0-2  DINAMO Moskva              [aet] 
   [1. Att: 1,000 (in Adler)] 
   [2. Gennadiy Yevryuzhikhin 91 pen, Anatoliy Kozhemyakin 108. Att: 10,000 (in Samarkand)] 
 Textilshchik Ivanovo       0-0  0-1  PAHTAKOR Tashkent 
   [1. (in Sochi)] 
   [2. Vassilis Hatzipanagis 85] 
 Torpedo Moskva             1-1  0-0  SHAKHTYOR Karaganda 
   [1. Yuriy Smirnov 35 – Anatoliy Novikov 50. Att: 3,000 (in Sochi)] 
   [2. Att: 10,000 (in Leninabad)] 
 [Mar 16, Apr 1] 
 ARARAT Yerevan             1-0  1-0  Alga Frunze 
 CHERNOMORETS Odessa        2-0  2-2  SKA Rostov-na-Donu 
   [1. Grigoriy Sapozhnikov 74, Vladimir Nechayev 85 pen. Att: 25,000] 
   [2. Leonid Baranovskiy 70, Anatoliy Shepel 71 – Alexei Yeskov 45 pen, 89. Att: 30,000] 
 Karpaty Lvov               1-1  0-0  NEFTCHI Baku 
   [1. Lev Brovarskiy 7 - ?] 
 Pamir Dushanbe             0-2  1-1  KAYRAT Alma-Ata 
   [1. Vladimir Chebotaryov 7, Yevgeniy Piunovskiy 44] 
   [2. Shuhrat Azamov ? – Yevgeniy Piunovskiy 13] 
 Torpedo Kutaisi            0-3  1-2  CSKA Moskva 
   [1. Vladimir Fedotov 24, 41, Boris Kopeikin 80]
   [2. Merab Chakhunashvili 4 – Vladimir Dorofeyev 75, 79 (in Simferopol)] 
 ZENIT Leningrad            1-1  2-0  Spartak Nalchik 
   [1. Georgiy Khromchenkov 61 – Nugzar Chitauri 86. Att: 3,000 (in Sochi)] 
   [2. Yuriy Zagumennykh 50, Georgiy Vyun 81. Att: 18,000] 
 [Mar 17, Apr 1] 
 ZARYA Voroshilovgrad       2-1  1-0  Spartak Orjonikidze 
   [1. Yuriy Vasenin 5, Alexandr Zhuravlyov 56 - Nodar Papelishvili 8. Att: 300 (in Sochi)] 
   [2. Vladimir Belousov 20. Att: 10,000] 
 [Mar 31, Apr 3] 
 SHAKHTYOR Donetsk          2-0  2-3  Metallurg Zaporozhye 
   [1. Vitaliy Starukhin 3, 26] 
   [2. Vitaliy Starukhin, Alexandr Vasin - ?]

Second round
 [May 31, Jun 22] 
 Shakhtyor Karaganda        0-2  1-3  CHERNOMORETS Odessa 
   [1. Anatoliy Shepel 25, Viktor Tomashevskiy 33] 
   [2. Nikolai Bushuyev 81 - Vladimir Nechayev 37 pen, Valeriy Kuzmin 77, Vitaliy Feidman 79] 
 [Jun 5, 27] 
 Dinamo Minsk               2-0  0-3  DNEPR Dnepropetrovsk  [aet] 
   [1. Nikolai Litvinov 13, Vladimir Sakharov 36. Att: 15,000] 
   [2. Viktor Romanyuk 17 pen, Valeriy Porkuyan 73, Yuriy Solovyov 119. Att: 20,000] 
 Kayrat Alma-Ata            1-1  1-2  DINAMO Kiev 
   [1. Vladislav Markin 73 – Anatoliy Puzach 8. Att: 10,000] 
   [2. Valeriy Yerkovich 69 – Vladimir Muntyan 21 pen, Viktor Kolotov 63] 
 Neftchi Baku               0-1  1-3  ARARAT Yerevan 
 SPARTAK Moskva             2-1  1-1  Dinamo Tbilisi 
   [1. Yevgeniy Lovchev 11, Alexandr Piskaryov 67 – Zurab Tsereteli 87. Att: 15,000] 
   [2. Nikolai Kiselyov 72 – Vissarion Mchedlishvili 16. Att: 21,000] 
 ZARYA Voroshilovgrad       2-0  0-1  Shakhtyor Donetsk 
   [1. Vladimir Onishchenko 7, Viktor Kuznetsov 23. Att: 25,000] 
   [2. Yuriy Gubich 12. Att: 20,000] 
 Zenit Leningrad            1-1  1-1  DINAMO Moskva         [pen 3-5] 
   [1. Anatoliy Zinchenko 57 – Vladimir Kozlov 27. Att: 20,000] 
   [2. Pavel Sadyrin 13 – Mikhail Gershkovich 3. Att: 25,000] 
 [Jun 6, 27] 
 CSKA Moskva                3-1  1-1  Pahtakor Tashkent 
   [1. Vladimir Dorofeyev 30, Wilhelm Tellinger 58 pen, Vladimir Fedotov 87 – Berador Abduraimov 71] 
   [2. Vladimir Dorofeyev 22 – Yuriy Belov 55]

Quarterfinals
 [Jul 11, 25] 
 ARARAT Yerevan             2-0  0-1  Zarya Voroshilovgrad 
   [1. Levon Ishtoyan ?, Eduard Markarov 33. Att: 41,300] 
   [2. Nikolai Pinchuk 87. Att: 25,000] 
 CSKA Moskva                0-2  0-3  DINAMO Kiev 
   [1. Viktor Kolotov 67, Vladimir Veremeyev 88. Att: 25,000] 
   [2. Vyacheslav Semyonov 7, Viktor Kolotov 44, Oleg Blokhin 49. Att: 30,000] 
 DNEPR Dnepropetrovsk       0-0  2-1  Spartak Moskva 
   [1. Att: 25,000] 
   [2. Anatoliy Grinko 48, Valeriy Porkuyan 74 - Alexandr Kokorev 80. Att: 23,000] 
 [Jul 12, 25] 
 DINAMO Moskva              3-0  3-2  Chernomorets Odessa 
   [1. Yuriy Pudyshev 19, 62, Vladimir Kozlov 61. Att: 31,000] 
   [2. Anatoliy Kozhemyakin 9, 30, 85 – Anatoliy Shepel 39 pen, Igor Ivanenko 55. Att: 15,000]

Semifinals
 [Aug 1, 15] 
 Dnepr Dnepropetrovsk       0-1  0-1  ARARAT Yerevan 
   [1. Eduard Markarov] 
   [2. Eduard Markarov] 
 [Aug 16, Sep 12] 
 DINAMO Kiev                1-1  1-1  Dinamo Moskva         [pen 6-5] 
   [1. Viktor Kolotov 66 pen – Gennadiy Yevryuzhikhin 14. Att: 40,000] 
   [2. Oleg Blokhin 3 – Vladimir Kozlov 39. Att: 35,000]

Final

External links
 Complete calendar. helmsoccer.narod.ru
 1973 Soviet Cup. Footballfacts.ru
 1973 Soviet football season. RSSSF

Soviet Cup seasons
Cup
Soviet Cup
Soviet Cup